Gertrude Himmelfarb (August 8, 1922 – December 30, 2019), also known as Bea Kristol, was an American historian. She was a leader of conservative interpretations of history and historiography. She wrote extensively on intellectual history, with a focus on Great Britain and the Victorian era, as well as on contemporary society and culture.

Background 
Himmelfarb was born in Brooklyn, New York, the daughter of Bertha (née Lerner) and Max Himmelfarb, both of Russian Jewish background. She received her undergraduate degree from Brooklyn College in 1942 and her doctorate from the University of Chicago in 1950.  Himmelfarb later went on to study at the University of Cambridge in the United Kingdom, and the Jewish Theological Seminary in New York.

In 1942, she married Irving Kristol, known as the "godfather" of neoconservatism, and had two children, Elizabeth Nelson and William Kristol, a political commentator and editor of The Weekly Standard. She never changed her last name. Sociologist Daniel Bell wrote that theirs was "the best marriage of our generation" and her husband wrote that he was  “astonished how intellectually twinned” the two were “pursuing different subjects while thinking the same thoughts and reaching the same conclusions”.

She was long involved in Jewish conservative intellectual circles. Professor Emerita at the Graduate School of the City University of New York, she was the recipient of many awards and honorary degrees. She served on the Council of Scholars of the Library of Congress, the Council of Academic Advisors of the American Enterprise Institute, and the Council of the National Endowment for the Humanities. She was a Fellow of the British Academy and of the American Academy of Arts and Sciences, and a member of the American Philosophical Society. In 1991, she delivered the Jefferson Lecture under the auspices of the National Endowment for the Humanities. In 2004, she was awarded the National Humanities Medal by the president of the United States of America. She died on December 30, 2019, at the age of 97.

Historiography 
Himmelfarb long nurtured the neoconservative movement in U.S. politics and intellectual life; her husband, Irving Kristol, helped found the movement.

Himmelfarb was a leading defender of traditional historical methods and practices. Her book, The New History and the Old (published in 1987 and revised and expanded in 2004), is a critique of the varieties of "new history" that have sought to displace the old. The "New Histories" she critiqued include: quantitative history that presumes to be more "scientific" than conventional history, but relies on partial and dubious data; Marxist historiography derived from economic assumptions and class models that leave little room for the ideas and beliefs of contemporaries or the protagonists and events of history; psychoanalytic history dependent on theories and speculations that violate the accepted criteria of historical evidence; analytic history that reduces history to a series of isolated "moments" with no overriding narrative structure; social history, "history from the bottom", that denigrates the role of politics, nationality, and individuals (the "great men" of history); and, later, postmodernist history, which denies even the ideal of objectivity, viewing all of history as a "social construct" on the part of the historian.

Himmelfarb criticized A.J.P. Taylor for seeking to "demoralize" history in his 1961 book The Origins of the Second World War, and for refusing to recognize "moral facts" about interwar Europe. Himmelfarb maintained that Taylor was wrong to treat Adolf Hitler as a "normal" German leader playing by the traditional rules of diplomacy in The Origins of the Second World War, instead of being a "world-historical" figure such as Napoleon.

Himmelfarb energetically rejected postmodern academic approaches:

Ideas
Himmelfarb was best known as a historian of Victorian England, but she put that period in a larger context. Her book, The Idea of Poverty, opens with an extended analysis of Adam Smith and Thomas Malthus, who helped shape debate and policies through much the nineteenth century and beyond. Nominated for the National Book Award, Victorian Minds features such eighteenth-century "proto-Victorians" as Edmund Burke and Jeremy Bentham, concluding with the "last Victorian", John Buchan, 1st Baron Tweedsmuir, whose novels depict a twentieth-century imbued with Victorian values. The Moral Imagination ranges from Burke to Winston Churchill and Lionel Trilling, with assorted Victorians and non-Victorians in between. On Looking into the Abyss has modern culture and society in the forefront and the Victorians in the background, while One Nation, Two Cultures is entirely about American culture and society. The Roads to Modernity enlarges the perspective of the Age of Enlightenment, both chronologically and nationally, placing the British Enlightenment in opposition to the French and in accord with the American. The Jewish Odyssey of George Eliot and The People of the Book focus on attitudes to Jews, Judaism, and Zionism in England from their readmission in the seventeenth century to the present.

In scores of essays she demonstrated that Victorian "values" ("virtues", she calls them) were not unique to that time and place. "The Victorian Ethos: Before and after Victoria" is the title of one essay; "Victorianism before Victoria" are the opening words of another. Today, the word "Victorian" may have a disagreeable and crabbed connotation, conjuring up repressive sexual and social mores. Himmelfarb humanized and democratized that concept. In an interview after receiving the National Humanities Medal, she explained that the Victorian virtues – prudence, temperance, industriousness, decency, responsibility – were thoroughly pedestrian. "They depended on no special breeding, talent, sensibility, or even money. They were common, everyday virtues, within the capacity of ordinary people. They were the virtues of citizens, not of heroes or saints – and of citizens of democratic countries, not aristocratic ones". Himmelfarb has argued "for the reintroduction of traditional values (she prefers the term 'virtues'), such as shame, responsibility, chastity, and self-reliance, into American political life and policy-making".

One of her most outspoken admirers is Gordon Brown, the former Labour Party Prime Minister. His introduction to the British edition of Roads to Modernity opens: "I have long admired Gertrude Himmelfarb's historical work, in particular her love of the history of ideas, and her work has stayed with me ever since I was a history student at Edinburgh University."

In an obituary, David Brooks described Himmelfarb as "The Historian of Moral Revolution".

Bibliography

Books 
 Lord Acton: A Study of Conscience and Politics (1952)  
 Darwin and the Darwinian Revolution (1959)  online free
 Victorian Minds (1968)  
 On Liberty and Liberalism: The Case of John Stuart Mill  (1974)  
 The Idea of Poverty: England in the Early Industrial Age (1984)  online free
 Marriage and Morals Among the Victorians (1986) online free
 The New History and the Old (1987, 2004)  online free
 Poverty and Compassion: The Moral Imagination of the Late Victorians (1991)  online free
 On Looking into the Abyss: Untimely Thoughts on Culture and Society (1994)  online free
 The De-Moralization of Society: From Victorian Virtues to Modern Values (1995)  
 One Nation, Two Cultures (1999)  
 
 The Moral Imagination: From Edmund Burke to Lionel Trilling (2006)  
 The Jewish Odyssey of George Eliot (2009)  
 The People of the Book: Philosemitism in England, from Cromwell to Churchill (Encounter Books, 2011) 
 
Edited 
 Lord Acton, Essays on Freedom and Power (Free Press, 1948) 
 Milton Himmelfarb, Jews and Gentiles (Encounter Books, 2007) 
 Irving Kristol, The Neoconservative Persuasion (Basic Books, 2011) online free
 Thomas Robert Malthus, Essay on Population (Modern Library, 1960) 
 John Stuart Mill, Essays on Politics and Culture (Doubleday, 1962) 
 John Stuart Mill, On Liberty (Penguin, 1974) 
 Alexis de Tocqueville, Memoir on Pauperism (Ivan Dee, 1997) 
 The Spirit of the Age: Victorian Essays (Yale University Press, 2007)

Critical studies and reviews of Himmelfarb's work
Past and present

References

Cited source

External links 
 
 
  also Paul Johnson, Brian Lamb, Frank McCourt, Robert D. Richardson, Jr., Cornel West, Simon Winchester
 
 
 
 
 
 
 

1922 births
2019 deaths
20th-century American historians
20th-century American women writers
21st-century American historians
21st-century American women writers
Alumni of Girton College, Cambridge
American people of Russian-Jewish descent
American Trotskyists
American women historians
Brooklyn College alumni
Charles Darwin biographers
City University of New York faculty
Communist women writers
Fellows of the American Academy of Arts and Sciences
Corresponding Fellows of the British Academy
Historians of the United Kingdom
Historiographers
Jewish American historians
Jewish Theological Seminary of America alumni
National Humanities Medal recipients
New York (state) Republicans
Writers from Brooklyn
University of Chicago alumni
Historians from New York (state)
American expatriates in the United Kingdom
Members of the American Philosophical Society